Stelis tortilis is a species of orchid plant native to Colombia.

References 

tortilis
Flora of Colombia